Charles Plummer, FBA (1851–1927) was an English historian and cleric, best known as the editor of Sir John Fortescue's The Governance of England, and for coining the term "bastard feudalism". He was the fifth son of Matthew Plummer of St Leonards-on-Sea, Sussex. He matriculated at Corpus Christi College, Oxford in 1869, graduating B.A. and S.C.L. in 1873 and becoming a Fellow.

Works
Plummer was an editor of Bede, and also edited numerous Irish and Hiberno-Latin texts, including the two volume Vitae Sanctorum Hiberniae (1910), a modern companion volume to which is Richard Sharpe's Medieval Irish saints' lives: an introduction to Vitae Sanctorum Hiberniae'.

Plummer edited John Earle's Two of the Saxon Chronicles Parallel (1865), producing a Revised Text with notes, appendices, and glossary in 1892. This work presented the A and E texts of the Anglo-Saxon Chronicle.

Plummer delivered the Ford Lectures at Oxford University in 1901.

References

External links

 

Irish textsVitae Sanctorum Hiberniae'' (1910). Vol. 1 and vol. 2 available from the Internet Archive.
Two of the Saxon Chronicles Parallel (1892).

1851 births
1927 deaths
19th-century English historians
20th-century English historians